Artem Ruslanovych Kulishenko (born 15 April 1994) is a Ukrainian professional football striker who is currently a free agent.

He is a product of FC Chornomorets Youth Sportive school. His first trainer was Vitaliy Hotsulyak. In March 2014 he signed one year on loan contract with Latvian football club Daugava Daugavpils.

References

External links

 
 

1994 births
Living people
Footballers from Odesa
Ukrainian footballers
Ukraine youth international footballers
Association football forwards
FC Daugava players
FC Real Pharma Odesa players
FC Chornomorets Odesa players
FC Chornomorets-2 Odesa players
MFC Mykolaiv players
MFC Mykolaiv-2 players
FC Zhemchuzhyna Odesa players
Ukrainian First League players
Ukrainian Second League players
Ukrainian expatriate footballers
Ukrainian expatriate sportspeople in Latvia
Ukrainian expatriate sportspeople in Sweden
Ukrainian expatriate sportspeople in Armenia
Expatriate footballers in Latvia
Expatriate footballers in Sweden
Expatriate footballers in Armenia